Adi bin Said (born 15 October 1990) is a Bruneian professional footballer who plays as a striker for Brunei Super League club Kasuka FC and the Brunei national football team.

Club career

Early career and rise at DPMM FC
Adi began his footballing career with Manggis United, coached by former Brunei forward Majidi Ghani. He joined newly-promoted Majra FC in 2007 and played for them in the Brunei Premier League until 2012, when his exploits on the international scene attracted Brunei's sole professional club DPMM FC to sign him for the 2012 S.League season. He scored his first goal for DPMM against Warriors FC on 23 June that year.

Adi saw much playing time as a substitute in the following season, but the squad played underwhelmingly and finished in eighth place, costing Vjeran Simunic his job. Adi's new coach Steve Kean in contrast was more reluctant to utilise him, restricting Adi to only 10 appearances in the 2014 S.League. However, he made most of his chances count, scoring in the final of the League Cup, and netting two braces against Hougang United and Woodlands Wellington in an August purple patch.

After a quiet 2015, Adi was given starts in all of DPMM's domestic cup matches for the 2016 campaign. He scored with a direct free kick in a 2-1 win over Tampines Rovers in the 2016 Singapore League Cup on 21 July.

Adi scored 8 goals in all competitions in a largely disappointing 2017, to finish behind Rafael Ramazotti in the club's goalscoring tally for the year. The following season, Adi started ahead of elder brother and new captain Shahrazen in a new 4-3-3 formation deployed by Brazilian coach Renê Weber. Adi finished the season with 11 goals and 10 assists, making him joint-top assist-maker of the league, the other being Riku Moriyasu of Albirex Niigata (S).

UiTM FC
After a successful trial in December 2018 (including scoring a hat-trick in a friendly), Adi signed a one-year contract with Malaysia Premier League side UiTM FC, becoming the first Bruneian local-born expatriate footballer ever. He scored within twenty seconds of his debut in a 1–3 victory against PDRM FA on 1 February, managing to get into the scoresheet twice. After two goals and six assists, he was released by UiTM FC in late May.

Back to DPMM
Two months later, Adi returned to DPMM FC and made his first appearance since coming back in the 3–3 draw against Warriors FC on 6 July. He scored his first goal since his return in the 3-0 victory over Geylang International on 2 August, in a game where his younger brother Hakeme debuted for the first team and shared a scoresheet with. He netted a brace in the penultimate league fixture which was a 5–4 home win against Hougang United on 29 September.

Kota Ranger
At the start of the 2020 Brunei Super League, Adi left DPMM to join Kota Ranger FC, reuniting him with his brother Amalul Said. He also became the team captain, taking over from Afi Aminuddin. He made his debut at the 2020 Piala Sumbangsih on 8 February, scoring a hat-trick against MS ABDB.

Kasuka
Adi signed for Kasuka FC in time for the 2022 Brunei FA Cup season. He scored a brace on his debut against Lun Bawang FC in a 13–0 victory on 7 August. He followed this with four goals in the next fixture against Dagang FT. He scored a total of 20 goals en route to the final of the competition where he faced off against his former club DPMM FC in a losing effort, 2–1 at the Track & Field Sports Complex on 4 December.

Adi scored the first goal of the 2023 Brunei Super League against MS PPDB on 3 March, which finished 4–0.

International career
Like his brother Shahrazen Said, Adi became an undisputed starter in the forward position for the Brunei national team at various levels.

At the 26th SEA Games, Adi was selected for the Brunei national under-23 football team, where he scored 3 goals in 5 appearances. He captained the same side in 2013, although failing to convert in 4 outings.

Adi played a starring role in helping the Brunei under-21s win the 2012 edition of the Hassanal Bolkiah Trophy, a tournament for the national under-21 teams of the ASEAN Football Federation. He scored 5 goals, scoring in every game to become joint top scorer with Indonesia's Andik Vermansyah. In the 2014 tournament, he was picked as one of the 5 permitted overage players and once again became the top scorer with 6 goals, despite being eliminated in the group stage.

Adi was selected for the Brunei squad at the 2012 AFF Suzuki Cup qualification, where he scored his first senior international goal against Timor-Leste. He was selected again for the 2014 edition, netting twice. He scored the winning goal in Brunei's first ever victory in World Cup qualification, versus Chinese Taipei in the first leg of the 2018 World Cup qualifying first round for AFC.

Despite his irregular club form, Adi was selected for the 2016 AFF Suzuki Cup qualification matches held in Cambodia in October. He scored the first goal against Timor-Leste in Brunei's first group match, which went 2-1 to the Wasps. He also began the scoring in the third game against Laos but this time Brunei lost 4-3.

Adi was back in the starting lineup for the 2016 AFC Solidarity Cup held a fortnight later in neighbouring Sarawak, Malaysia. He scored from a direct free-kick in the 4-0 win over Timor-Leste. In the semi-final against Macau, he was sacrificed when fielding the replacement goalkeeper after Wardun Yussof was sent off in the 55th minute. Brunei lost 4-3 on penalties in the end.

Adi laced up for the national team at the 2018 AFF Suzuki Cup qualifying matches against Timor-Leste held in early September. Adi made appearances in both legs as Brunei failed to progress to the Suzuki Cup group stages with a 2-3 aggregate score.

Adi was selected for the two-legged 2022 World Cup qualification matches against Mongolia in June 2019. He started the first leg in Ulanbaatar which finished 2-0 to the Blue Wolves. In the second leg, Adi fired in a long-range free-kick which was parried to the path of Razimie Ramlli for Brunei's second goal to level the tie on aggregate. Unfortunately Mongolia subsequently scored a penalty to knock Brunei out of the 2022 World Cup and also the 2023 Asian Cup.

In November 2022, Brunei finally managed to qualify for the 2022 AFF Championship via a 6–3 aggregate win over Timor-Leste in the qualifying round. Adi made two substitute appearances, creating two goals in the first leg. He donned the Brunei jersey a total of three times in the actual tournament, but failed to make an influence as Brunei lost all of their matches in the group stage.

International goals
Scores and results list Brunei's goal tally first.

Honours

Team
Majra FC
 Brunei League Cup: 2011
DPMM FC
 S.League: 2015
 Singapore Premier League: 2019
 Singapore League Cup (2): 2012, 2014
Kota Ranger FC
 Piala Sumbangsih: 2020
Brunei national under-21 football team
 Hassanal Bolkiah Trophy: 2012

Individual
 
  Meritorius Service Medal (PJK) (2012)

 Singapore Premier League Player of the Month: August 2018
 Singapore Premier League top assist provider: 2018 (joint with Riku Moriyasu)

Personal life

Adi has three elder brothers who have represented Brunei; his teammate Shah Razen is the eldest of all, while Amalul and Ahmad Hafiz are former DPMM players. He has five younger brothers: former Majra FC strike partner Abdul Azim, another ex-Majra player Amirul Sabqi, Menglait FC player Amiruddin Nizam, former MS ABDB striker Abdul Mateen, and Brunei international Hakeme Yazid of DPMM FC.

External links

References 

Living people
Association football forwards
Bruneian footballers
Brunei international footballers
DPMM FC players
Bruneian expatriate footballers
Bruneian expatriates in Malaysia
Expatriate footballers in Malaysia
Competitors at the 2011 Southeast Asian Games
Competitors at the 2013 Southeast Asian Games
1990 births
Competitors at the 2019 Southeast Asian Games
Southeast Asian Games competitors for Brunei